is a town in Yamagata District, Hiroshima Prefecture, Japan.

Akiōta was formed on October 1, 2004 from the merger of the towns of Kake and Togouchi, and the village of Tsutsuga, all from Yamagata District.

As of April 30, 2017, the town has an estimated population of 6,585, with 3,207 households, and a population density of 19 persons per km². The total area is 342.25 km².

On April 7, 2020, Shinji Kosaka, the Mayor of Akiōta Town resigned after having accepted 200,000 yen from former Minister of Justice Katsuyuki Kawai in a vote-buying scandal.

Geography

Climate
Akiōta has a humid subtropical climate (Köppen climate classification Cfa) characterized by cool to mild winters and hot, humid summers.

Demographics
Per Japanese census data, the population of Akiōta in 2020 is 5,740 people. Akiōta has been conducting censuses since 1920.

Notable places
Nukui Dam
Mount Osorakan
Sandan Ravine

Notable people from Akiōta
Minoru Genda (1904 – 1989) — commander of the JASDF and politician (from Kake)
Kimie Bessho — para table tennis player
Yasuhiko Moriwaki — judo wrestler (from the former town of Kake)

References

External links

  

Towns in Hiroshima Prefecture